James Bowden (birth unknown – ) was a professional rugby league footballer who played in the 1950s.

Playing career

International honours
Jim Bowden won a cap for England while at Huddersfield in 1953 against France, and won caps for Great Britain while at Huddersfield in 1954 against Australia (2 matches), and New Zealand.

Jim Bowden also represented Great Britain while at Huddersfield between 1952 and 1956 against France (1 non-Test match).

Challenge Cup Final appearances
Jim Bowden played right-, i.e. number 10, in Huddersfield's 15–10 victory over St. Helens in the 1953 Challenge Cup Final during the 1952-53 season at Wembley Stadium, London  on Saturday 25 April 1953, in front of a crowd of 89,588.

County Cup Final appearances
Jim Bowden played, and scored 5-goals in Huddersfield's 16–3 victory over Castleford in the 1950 Yorkshire County Cup Final during the 1950–51 season at Headingley Rugby Stadium, Leeds on Saturday 4 November 1950.

Contemporaneous Article Extract
"Won Yorkshire Rugby Union schoolboy honours while at Giggleswick School, and played for his county in Rugby League Football as a centre. Huddersfield have switched him to the pack, where he is following in father's (a Bramley forward) footsteps."

Outside of Rugby League
Jim Bowden worked for many years as a Dentist in Wakefield.

Genealogical information
Jim Bowden's father was a rugby league forward for Bramley.

References

External links
(archived by archive.is) U.K. League Hooker in Doubt
WEMBLEY - RUGBY LEAGUE FINAL (aka HUDDERSFIELD V ST. HELENS) video newsreel film

2000s deaths
England national rugby league team players
English dentists
English rugby league players
Great Britain national rugby league team players
Huddersfield Giants players
Place of birth missing
Place of death missing
Rugby league centres
Rugby league props
Year of birth missing
Year of death missing
Yorkshire rugby league team players